The 2010 Indianapolis Colts season was the franchise's 58th season in the National Football League, the 27th in Indianapolis, and the second under head coach Jim Caldwell. The defending AFC champions were looking to repeat as AFC champions and win it all in Super Bowl XLV to end their four-year championship drought. It was also the final season with Peyton Manning as the team's starting quarterback, as he would sit out the next season due to a neck injury and would be released by Indianapolis on March 7, 2012. Manning's last game as a Colt was on January 8, 2011, a 16-17 loss to the New York Jets in the Wild Card Round and would sign with the Denver Broncos a year later, on March 20, 2012.

The Colts also clinched their ninth consecutive postseason appearance, tying the then all-time record for consecutive postseason appearances by a team with the Dallas Cowboys, who made the playoffs every season from 1975 to 1983. Though the Colts failed to win 12 or more games for the first time since 2002, the team did win the AFC South division title for the seventh time in eight seasons, but were eliminated narrowly in the Wild Card Round by the Jets.

Offseason

Additions

Departures

Free agents

2010 NFL Draft

Having finished the season as the runner–up in the Super Bowl, the Colts held the 31st pick in each round. They had previously traded their sixth–round pick to the Philadelphia Eagles for a seventh–round pick in the 2009 NFL Draft.

Undrafted free agents

Staff and roster

Staff

Final roster

Schedule

Preseason

Regular season

Postseason

Standings

Game summaries

Week 1: at Houston Texans

The Colts began their season at Reliant Stadium in an AFC South duel against the Houston Texans.  Indianapolis started the season going 3-and-out on their first offensive possession of the new year.  The Texans got good field position with a big punt return from Jacoby Jones to set up a 30-yard field goal to give them a 3–0 lead. The offense continued to struggle throughout the first half, getting two first downs on the next drive, however, eventually having to punt.  The Texans continued to show energy on both offense and defense by scoring two more time, a field goal and a touchdown, giving the Texans a 13–0 lead halfway through the second quarter.  The Colts eventually got the offense going late in the second quarter by scoring on a touchdown reception by Reggie Wayne, which broke the lead down to one possession. Adam Vinatieri made a 20-yard field goal at the end of the first half and the Colts went into the half trailing 13–10. The momentum was seemingly shifting to Indianapolis, until Houston took almost eight minutes off the third quarter clock on a 15-play drive, 13 rushes, that resulted in one of Arian Foster's rushing touchdowns on the day to give Houston a 20–10 lead. Peyton Manning and the offense struggled throughout the third quarter with missed opportunities and continued to shoot themselves in the foot with penalties.  With the start of the fourth quarter Houston scored another touchdown and broke the game open.  The Colts would eventually score two touchdowns late in the game, only when there was no chance of a comeback.

With the final score 34–24, the Colts were 0–1 to start a season for the first time since 2008, when they lost to the Chicago Bears.

Week 2: vs. New York Giants

The 2010 meeting between the Indianapolis Colts and the New York Giants marked the second time that the two quarterback brothers of Peyton and Eli Manning met in a football game, the last coming in 2006.  The game started out good early for the Colts with a running touchdown from Donald Brown and two separate stops by the defense against the Giants.  As the second quarter began the Colts kept rolling on the offensive side of the ball.  Two touchdown passes during the second quarter and a field goal from Adam Vinatieri helped the Colts extend a halftime lead of 24–0.  With the start of the third quarter the Giants came out and scored early on a touchdown pass to Mario Manningham from Eli Manning.  With a 24–7 lead, the Colts continued to pound the Giants on defense, forcing a fumble which was returned for a touchdown.  The fourth quarter continued with a touchdown pass to Reggie Wayne while the Giants eventually scored their second touchdown in the last minutes of the quarter.  The Colts won the ballgame 38–14 ending their three-game regular season losing streak and improving their record on the season to 1–1.

Week 3: at Denver Broncos

The Colts traveled to Denver, Colorado for an AFC conference matchup with the Denver Broncos. The game started with punts by both teams on their own opening drives. The Colts then drove down the field and scored on a 38-yard field goal by Adam Vinatieri. After a defensive interception set the Colts up down field, Indianapolis was forced to kick another field goal to extend their lead to 6–0 at the end of the first quarter. The Colts offense did not stop firing with the start of the second quarter, Peyton Manning threw to Austin Collie for his first touchdown of the game and gave the Colts a 13–0 lead. With the start of the second quarter the Bronco offense came alive. However, many offensive mistakes and key plays caused Denver to get points only on a late field goal by Matt Prater. At halftime, the Indianapolis Colts held the lead of 13–3. Denver received the ball first in the second half and was able to capitalize with a touchdown drive closing the game to a three-point margin. After switching possession, the Colts were able to respond with a touchdown drive that included Blair White, who was just signed from the practice squad prior to the game. Denver then scored a field goal late in the third quarter making the game a 20–13 contest heading into the fourth quarter. After defensive stops, the Colts were able to score a touchdown on another Austin Collie reception to take a commanding 27–13. The defense was able to stop the Broncos on their next possession allowing the Colts to win 27–13, and take their second straight game of the season, improving their record to 2–1.

Week 4: at Jacksonville Jaguars

The Indianapolis Colts came into a crucial divisional matchup with the Jacksonville Jaguars, with added importance after the season opening loss to the Texans.  With the first possession of the ballgame, the Colts drove down the field with a mix of pass and run plays, scoring the opening touchdown of the game.  However, Jacksonville returned the favor by going 76 yards to tie the game up, and by the end of the first quarter the game was tied at 7–7.  In the second quarter Maurice Jones-Drew scored on a touchdown run giving the Jaguars their first lead of the day, with the Colts eventually responded and tying the up 14–14 going into halftime.  With the beginning of the second half both teams failed to score on their next possessions, with the Colts punting to the Jaguars midway through the third quarter.  David Garrard threw his first touchdown pass of the day, giving the Jaguars a 21–14 lead towards the end of the third quarter.  With the Colts trailing midway through the fourth quarter, Peyton Manning drove the team down the field to score on a Joseph Addai run.  With the Jaguars responding and the Colts driving down the field to tie with 0:52 left, the game was a 28–28 with less than thirty seconds in the game.  Jacksonville was able to get two big plays on their last drive of the game setting up Josh Scobee for a 59-yard field goal, which was good.  The Indianapolis Colts started 0–2 in the AFC South for the first time following this loss, dropping out of first place and falling behind the Houston Texans.

Week 5: vs. Kansas City Chiefs

After losing the previous week to Jacksonville, the Indianapolis Colts came back home to Lucas Oil Stadium to battle with an undefeated Kansas City Chiefs team.  The Chiefs' head coach, Todd Haley opened up the ballgame with an onside kick intended to give Kansas City the ball first.  However, after it bounced less than 10 yards, the Colts received possession deep in Kansas City territory.  Indianapolis was unable to capitalize on the good field position and forced Adam Vinatieri to kick a 20-yard field goal.  Throughout the first quarter neither teams' offenses were able to get into a rhythm and by the end of the first quarter the Colts held a slim lead by the score of 3–0.  With the start of the second quarter the offensive woes continued.  The Colts were again unable to score a touchdown on good field position and were forced to kick their second field goal of the day.  After a failed running play of fourth down by the Colts, the Chiefs were able to move down the field on good passes by Matt Cassel and a penalty on the Colts and were able to kick a field goal. Going into halftime, the score was 6–3 Colts.  The third quarter continued to prove to be a defensive struggle.  The Colts kicked another field goal midway through, however the Chiefs drove down the field to score another field goal.  A Peyton Manning interception set up another field goal by the Chiefs which tied the game at 9–9.  At the beginning of the fourth quarter the Colts continued their scoring ways of the day with a fourth field goal from Vinatieri.  Finally with four minutes left in the ballgame, Mike Hart broke open an 11-yard run for the only touchdown of the day by both teams.  The Colts won the game 19–9 and improved to 3–2 on the season.  With the Chiefs loss they were not longer an undefeated team in the NFL.

Week 6: at Washington Redskins

Coming off their home win over the Chiefs, the Colts flew to FedExField for a Week 6 interconference duel with the Washington Redskins on Sunday night.  Indianapolis delivered the game's opening punch as quarterback Peyton Manning found wide receiver Pierre Garçon on a 57-yard touchdown pass, but the Redskins answered with running back Ryan Torain getting a 9-yard touchdown run.  In the second quarter, the Colts regained the lead as Manning hooked up with wide receiver Austin Collie on a 5-yard touchdown pass, followed by kicker Adam Vinatieri booting a 43-yard field goal.

Washington began the third quarter with Torain's 1-yard touchdown run, yet Indianapolis replied with running back Joseph Addai's 13-yard touchdown run.  The Redskins would continue to remain close as kicker Graham Gano got a 39-yard field goal.  In the fourth quarter, the Colts continued to add onto their lead as Vinatieri got a 33-yard field goal.  Washington tried to rally as quarterback Donovan McNabb completed an 8-yard touchdown pass to running back Keiland Williams, yet Indianapolis' defense held tough to preserve the victory.  With the win, the Colts improved to 4–2 and remained in a tie atop the AFC South division.

With about nine and a half minutes left in the second quarter, Peyton Manning suffered a painful hit from two Redskins defenders in which his back and neck bent violently backwards. Manning finished the season, but missed all of 2011 and suffered from neck issues for the rest of his career.

Week 8: vs. Houston Texans

In a rematch of the opening game of the season, where the Houston Texans defeated the Indianapolis Colts 34–24, the Colts looked for revenge in their first Monday night game in Indianapolis since 2006.  Both defenses came out strong in the beginning with both teams punting on their first drives.  On the Colts second possession of the game, Indianapolis drove down the field for a Jacob Tamme touchdown, giving the Colts a 7–0 lead.  Going into the second quarter, the Indianapolis offense and defense proved too much for the Texans.  Kelvin Hayden took a 25-yard interception to the end zone and gave Indianapolis a 14–0 lead.  On the following drive, Houston went down into Colts territory, however was only able to score a field goal ending the Indianapolis shutout.  An Adam Vinatieri field goal gave the Colts a 17–3 lead going into halftime.  Houston came out of the locker room improved, however Peyton Manning and the Indianapolis offense continued to be productive scoring a touchdown on a Reggie Wayne reception in the beginning of the first half.  Following a Matt Schaub touchdown and another Vinatieri field goal, the Colts held a 27–10 lead going into the fourth quarter.  With the Houston offense looking improved and the Indianapolis defense struggling, the Texans were able to score a touchdown on an Arian Foster run, while the Colts scored another field goal.  With less than two minutes remaining in the game, a fumble by Schaub sealed the game with the final score being 30–17.  With the win, Indianapolis moved to 5–2 on the season and held sole possession of first place for the first time in the 2010 season.

Week 9: at Philadelphia Eagles

On the road at Lincoln Financial Field, the Indianapolis Colts played a NFC opponent in the Philadelphia Eagles for the first time since the 2006 season.  The game did not start well for the Colts who allowed the Eagles to score a quick touchdown on only 3 plays covering 72 yards.  A Peyton Manning interception caused more concern as the Colts now found themselves under the gun halfway through the first quarter.  Two key defensive stops allowed the Eagles to only score two field goals making it a 13–0 Eagles lead heading into the second quarter.  A touchdown pass from Manning to Jacob Tamme allowed the Colts to get back into the game trailing the Eagles only 13–7.  A Philadelphia field goal from David Akers added to the lead, however the Colts continued chipping away.  A hard hit on wide receiver Austin Collie, who was returning from injury that week, caused a 10‑minute delay in the game in which he was strapped to a stripper and taken to a nearby hospital, where he was diagnosed with a concussion.  The Colts, playing with passion, drove down the field and scored a touchdown and field goal within the final two minutes of the half, giving them a 17–16 lead at halftime.  The offensive production seen by the Colts in the second quarter was nowhere to be found in the third.  The Colts began the third quarter with two three-and-outs while the Eagles got the lead back with a 44-yard field goal halfway through the quarter.  Going into the fourth quarter, the Eagles were driving down into scoring position where a 1-yard run by Michael Vick gave the Eagles a 26–17 lead over the Colts.  A continued lack of offensive production gave the Eagles the ball back and time to milk the clock.  The Colts received the ball back with less than four minutes remaining in the game, trailing by two scores and drove down to score a touchdown.  Jim Caldwell elected to kick the ball away to Philadelphia with 1:50 left, a first down and a defensive stop gave the Colts the ball back with less than 0:50 seconds in the game.  After driving to midfield, Manning threw his second interception of the game and sealed the Indianapolis Colts third loss of the season.

Week 10: vs. Cincinnati Bengals

Following their third loss of the season, the Indianapolis Colts entered their home game against the Cincinnati Bengals with a chance to regain the lead in the AFC South.  Indianapolis came out energized in the first quarter where the Colts picked up a field goal with three minutes remaining in the quarter, and a Kelvin Hayden interception returned for a touchdown.  The second quarter continued to see Colts dominance with a Javarris James touchdown run, extending the Colts lead to 17–0.  However, as the quarter wore on the defense began to allow larger gains and the Bengals were able to score a touchdown and a field goal in the last ten minutes of the half.  However, an Adam Vinatieri field goal gave the Colts a 20–10 lead going into halftime.  The Colts came out in the third quarter sluggish and both teams exchanged the ball throughout the rest of the quarter.  Another Vinatieri field goal gave the Colts a 23–10 lead.  With everything seeming secure, the Bengals were able to pick up a touchdown on a 19-yard pass from Carson Palmer making it a six-point game.  The Bengals onside kick attempt was successful with a late penalty by the Colts, giving the Bengals the ball at the Colts 40-yard line.  A fumble, the fifth turnover by the Bengals on the day, gave the Colts the ability to hold on to the lead and win the game 23–17, going to 6–3 on the season and taking first place in the AFC South by one game.

Week 11: at New England Patriots

The Colts' tenth game was an AFC duel against the Patriots. In the first quarter the Colts trailed early as QB Tom Brady made a 22-yard TD pass to WR Wes Welker. This was followed in the second quarter by Brady throwing an 8-yard TD pass to TE Aaron Hernandez. The Colts narrowed the lead with QB Peyton Manning completing a 1-yard TD pass to TE Gijon Robinson, but the Patriots responded with a 5-yard TD run by RB BenJarvus Green-Ellis. The Colts tried to close the gap after Manning found WR Reggie Wayne on an 11-yard TD pass. The Colts struggled further in the 3rd quarter with RB Danny Woodhead getting a 36-yard TD run, followed in the fourth quarter by kicker Shayne Graham nailing a 25-yard field goal. The Colts tried to close the gap after Manning made a 5 and an 18-yard TD pass to WR Blair White, but his final pass was intercepted, giving the Colts a loss.

With the loss, the Colts fell to 6–4.

Week 12: vs. San Diego Chargers

The Colts' eleventh game was an AFC duel against the Chargers. They took the lead in the first quarter after QB Peyton Manning made a 4-yard TD pass to TE Jacob Tamme. They had a problem maintaining this lead after kicker Nate Kaeding made a 28-yard field goal, followed by ILB Kevin Burnett returning an interception 29 yards for a touchdown, and then with Kaeding hitting a 33 and a 50-yard field goal. They tried to cut the lead as Manning made a 6-yard TD pass to WR Blair White, but the Chargers controlled the second half with Kaeding getting a 30-yard field goal, which was shortly followed by FS Eric Weddle returning an interception 41 yards for a touchdown, then with FB Mike Tolbert getting a 3-yard TD run, and Kaeding making a 20-yard field goal, settling both records to 6–5.  The Colts would have their 5- win season since 2002 at this point.

Week 13: vs. Dallas Cowboys

Hoping to break a two-game losing streak the Colts played on home ground for an Interconference duel with the Cowboys. In the first quarter the Colts caused problems with their defense after RB Tashard Choice got a 20-yard TD run, followed by kicker David Buehler hitting a 40-yard field goal. The offense had problems too as QB Peyton Manning's pass was intercepted by SS Orlando Scandrick and returned 40 yards for a touchdown. They responded with Manning getting a 13 and a 34-yard TD pass to WR Pierre Garçon and WR Reggie Wayne. The Cowboys increased their lead after Buehler made a 46-yard field goal, and with LB Sean Lee returning an interception 31 yards for a TD. The Colts got a slight lead with RB Javarris James getting a 1-yard TD run, followed by WR Taj Smith returning a blocked punt 2 yards for a touchdown. They trailed again with QB Jon Kitna completing a 2-yard TD pass to TE Jason Witten (With a successful 2-point conversion as Kitna passed to WR Roy E. Williams). They managed to tie the game after James made a 2-yard TD run. The decision was made in overtime when Buehler successfully made a 38-yard field goal to give the Colts a three-game losing streak, for the first time since 2002.

With the loss, the Colts fell to 6–6.

Week 14: at Tennessee Titans

Trying to snap a three-game losing streak, the Colts flew to LP Field for a Week 14 AFC South duel with the Tennessee Titans on Thursday night.  Indianapolis delivered the game's opening strike in the first quarter with a 1-yard touchdown run from rookie running back Javarris James.  The Colts would add onto their lead in the second quarter as quarterback Peyton Manning found wide receiver Pierre Garçon on a 1-yard and a 19-yard touchdown pass.  The Titans responded with running back Chris Johnson getting a 1-yard touchdown run.

Tennessee began to cut away at their deficit in the third quarter as quarterback Kerry Collins completed a 7-yard touchdown pass to tight end Craig Stevens, yet Indianapolis responded with a 21-yard field goal from kicker Adam Vinatieri.  The Colts added onto their lead in the fourth quarter with a 28-yard field goal from Vinatieri.  The Titans tried to rally as Collins completed a 9-yard touchdown pass to tight end Bo Scaife, yet Indianapolis rose to the challenge with Vinatieri booting a 47-yard field goal.  Tennessee closed out the game with Collins completing a 2-yard touchdown pass to Scaife.

With the win, the Colts improved to 7–6.

Week 15: vs. Jacksonville Jaguars

Coming off their win over the Titans the Colts played on home ground for an AFC South rivalry rematch against the Jaguars. In the first quarter the Colts took the lead as QB Peyton Manning threw a 7-yard TD pass to Austin Collie. The lead was narrowed with a 22-yard field goal from kicker Josh Scobee, but the Colts scored again as Manning found Collie again on a 27-yard TD pass. They conceded their first touchdown of the game when Mike Thomas returned a punt 78 yards to the endzone. After that, the Colts extended their lead with RB Donald Brown getting a 43-yard TD run, followed by kicker Adam Vinatieri nailing a 34-yard field goal. The lead was cut down with QB David Garrard completing a 6-yard TD pass to WR Mike Sims-Walker, but the Colts increased their lead with Vinatieri making a 37-yard field goal. The Jaguars tried to come back with Garrard finding Sims-Walker on a 1-yard TD pass. After that, the Colts soon pulled away with Tyjuan Hagler returning a failed onside kick 41 yards for a touchdown.

With the win, the Colts improved to 8–6.

Week 16: at Oakland Raiders

Coming off their win over the Jaguars the Colts flew to Oakland–Alameda County Coliseum for an AFC duel with the Raiders. In the first quarter the Colts trailed immediately after a 99-yard kickoff return was made by Jacoby Ford. They soon took the lead with RB Joseph Addai getting a 6-yard TD run, followed by kicker Adam Vinatieri getting a 30-yard field goal. They trailed again after kicker Sebastian Janikowski hit a 59 and a 38-yard field goal, but responded to take the lead back with QB Peyton Manning completing an 18-yard TD pass to TE Jacob Tamme. The lead was narrowed with Janikowski nailing a 51-yard field goal, but the Colts extended their lead with Manning getting a 4-yard TD pass to WR Blair White. The Raiders tried to keep up with Janikowski making a 45-yard field goal, but the Colts kept going with Manning completing a 7-yard TD pass to WR Pierre Garçon. The Raiders tried to come back after QB Jason Campbell threw a 6-yard TD pass to TE Zach Miller, but Manning ran for a first down on the Colts ensuing possession to seal the game.

With the win, Indianapolis improved to 9–6. This would also be Indianapolis last road win until week 8 in 2012 against Tennessee.

Week 17: vs. Tennessee Titans

Hoping to clinch a playoff spot the Colts played on home ground for a division rivalry rematch against the Titans. In the first quarter the Colts took the lead as kicker Adam Vinatieri made a 48-yard field goal, with the Titans replying as kicker Rob Bironas nailed a 26-yard field goal. The Colts scored again with Vinatieri making a 44-yard field goal, but the Titans re-tied the game with Bironas hitting a 42-yard field goal. The Colts tried to pull away with QB Peyton Manning completing a 7-yard TD pass to WR Reggie Wayne, but the Titans kept the score level as QB Kerry Collins made a 30-yard TD pass to WR Kenny Britt. The Colts still tried to pull away with Manning completing a 30-yard TD pass to WR Pierre Garçon, but the Titans re-tied the game for the fourth time as Collins threw a 15-yard TD pass to RB Chris Johnson. The Colts got away in the fourth quarter as Vinatieri got a 43-yard field goal.

With the win, the Colts finish on a 10–6 record and successfully clinched a play-off spot. As the New Orleans Saints also clinched a playoff spot, the 2010 season marked the first time in 10 years that both defending conference champions made the playoffs in the same season. This was also the final regular season game with Peyton Manning as the Colts' starting quarterback.

AFC wild card game vs. New York Jets

Entering the playoffs as the AFC #3 seed, the Colts began their playoff run at home in the AFC Wild Card round against the #6 New York Jets in a rematch of the 2009–10 AFC Championship Game.  After a scoreless first quarter, the Colts delivered the game's opening strike in the second quarter as quarterback Peyton Manning found wide receiver Pierre Garçon on a 57-yard touchdown pass.

The Jets answered in the third quarter with running back LaDainian Tomlinson getting a one-yard touchdown run, yet Indianapolis regained the lead with a 47-yard field goal from kicker Adam Vinatieri.  New York took the lead in the fourth quarter with Tomlinson getting another one-yard touchdown run.  The Colts regained the lead with a 32-yard and a 50-yard field goal from Vinatieri, but the Jets' Nick Folk kicked the game-winning 32-yard field goal.

With the loss, Indianapolis' season came to an end with an overall record of 10–7.

It would be Peyton Manning's final game as a Colt.

References

External links
 Indianapolis Colts official website

Indianapolis
AFC South championship seasons
Indianapolis Colts seasons
Colt